Adi Patricia Roche (born 11 July 1955) is an Irish activist, anti-nuclear advocate, and campaigner for peace, humanitarian aid and education.

She founded and is CEO of Chernobyl Children's Project International.

She has focused on the relief of suffering experienced by children in the wake of the 1986 Chernobyl nuclear disaster.

Early life
Adi Roche was born in Clonmel, County Tipperary in 1955. After finishing secondary school, she went to work for Aer Lingus. She left in 1984 to work full-time as a volunteer for the Irish Campaign for Nuclear Disarmament. She devised a Peace Education Programme and delivered it in over fifty schools throughout Ireland. In 1990, she became the first Irish woman elected to the board of directors of the International Peace Bureau at the United Nations in Geneva.

Chernobyl Children International

In 1991, Roche founded the Chernobyl Children International, to provide aid to the children of Belarus, Western Russia and Ukraine following the Chernobyl nuclear disaster of 1986. The organisation works in the areas of international development as well as medical and humanitarian aid. It works with children and families who continue to be affected by the disaster.

Under Roche's leadership, Chernobyl Children International (CCI) has delivered over €105 million to the areas most affected by the Chernobyl nuclear disaster and has enabled over 25,500 children affected by the Chernobyl disaster to come to Ireland for vital medical treatment and recuperation.

CCI's 'Homes of Hope' programme provides an alternative to state institutions through the use of 30 homes that have been purchased and renovated. This is the equivalent of closing two orphanages in Belarus. It takes children out of orphanages, and places them in loving homes of their own.

CCI has built and equipped the first ever baby hospice in Belarus. CCI has provided expert training to the staff to ensure the best care to patients. CCI pioneered the ground breaking adoption agreement between Ireland and Belarus, on behalf of the Government of Ireland. This agreement allowed hundreds of children to be adopted into Ireland.

Mental health and disability development: Since 1986 there has been a marked increase in children being born with mental and physical disabilities. CCI has pioneered the Human Rights of people incarcerated in institutional care. This is at the very heart of the CCI mission.

4,000 life-saving cardiac surgeries have been performed and enabled over the last fifteen years in collaboration with Dr. William Novick of Novick Cardiac Alliance.

Work with United Nations
Roche launched an exhibition of the Chernobyl disaster for the 15th Anniversary of the nuclear accident in the UN Headquarters in New York in 2001. The Chernobyl legacy was demonstrated through digital imagery, photographs and sculpture. Entitled Black Wind, White Land, the exhibition was a month-long, cross-cultural event featuring the works of artists who depicted the suffering caused by the disaster. It was deemed an outstanding success by the UN and had its European Premiere in Dublin in 2002.

She continues to work with the United Nations to highlight the consequences of the Chernobyl disaster. Over the last decade she has contributed to UN-sponsored conferences and symposia on the fallout of Chernobyl. She has addressed Ambassadors to the UN General Assembly, the UNESCO conference on Chernobyl, and the Manchester International Peace Festival. Roche has provided advice and suggestions to the UN Needs Assessment Mission and has made several submissions on how NGOs could best be helped in their attempts to deliver humanitarian aid to the most affected areas in Belarus, Ukraine and western Russia.

In July 2003, she was the keynote speaker at the launch of the International Chernobyl Research and Information Network (ICRIN) in Geneva, Switzerland. The ICRIN is am initiative joint-sponsored by the UN and the Swiss Agency for Development and Co-operation. Roche was appointed to represent NGOs on the Steering Committee of the ICRIN.

To mark the 18th Anniversary of the tragedy in April 2004, Roche was invited to speak at the UN General Assembly at their headquarters in New York and to screen the Oscar award-winning documentary Chernobyl Heart. In 2004, Chernobyl Children International received official NGO status by the U.N. She was also invited by the UNDP to sit on their organising committee, and act as the keynote speaker at the International Chernobyl Conference which was held in Minsk in April 2006 (to mark the 20th Anniversary of the Chernobyl disaster).

On 26 April 2016, the 30th anniversary of the Chernobyl disaster, Roche made a landmark address to the United Nations General Assembly in New York. In an unprecedented move, the Belarusian UN delegation provided her with their speaking time at the General Assembly discussion on Chernobyl in recognition of the international role Ireland and Chernobyl Children International has played in helping the victims of the Chernobyl catastrophe. It was the first time an ordinary person (non-diplomat/non-political figure) was extended the honour of speaking at the UN General Assembly during a country's allocated time.

On 8 December 2016, as a direct result of her address, the United Nations ratified the "Persistent Legacy of Chernobyl disaster", a symbolic element of which is the implementation of the "International Chernobyl Disaster Remembrance Day"

Honours and awards
Roche was awarded the European Woman Laureate Award following the release of the documentary film 'Black Wind, White Land' (1993) which highlighted the Chernobyl children's suffering. In the same year she received the title of the Republic's Person of the Year.

In 1997, Roche received Tipperary International Peace Award, described as "Ireland's outstanding award for humanitarian work." 

In 2001, Roche was awarded an honorary doctor of law degree by the University of Alberta, Canada. 

In 2007, Roche won the Robert Burns Humanitarian Award.

In 2010, Roche received the World of Children Health Award. Since then, Chernobyl Children International has saved the lives of thousands of children born with congenital heart defects. 

In 2015, Roche was named a World of Children Alumni Award Honoree, for the "incredible impact she continues to have in the lives of the children of the Chernobyl region".

Also in 2015, Roche won the Princess Grace Humanitarian Award.

Awards:
 President's Award Tipperary Chamber of Commerce 2019
 Freedom of the City of Cork 2016
 Pride of Ireland Lifetime Achievement Award 2016
 Princess Grace Humanitarian Award 2015
 Top 20 of Ireland's Greatest Women of All Time 2014
 Keynote speaker at the first anniversary commemorations of the Japanese earthquake in Fukushima 2012
 David Chow Humanitarian Award 2008
 Robert Burns Humanitarian Award 2007
 People's Alliance candidate for the Irish Presidential Campaign 1997
 European Person of the Year 1996
 European Woman Laureate Award 1996
 Irish Person of the Year 1996
 First Irish woman elected to the board of directors of the International Peace Bureau in Geneva
 Government appointee on the board of the Radiological Protection Institute of Ireland (RPII)

Honorary Degrees:
 Roche holds an Honorary Doctorate of Laws from the University of Alberta, Canada.
 In 2002 she was jointly awarded a Doctorate of Laws with Ali Hewson by the National University of Ireland, Galway.
 In 2016 she was jointly awarded a Doctorate of Letters with Ali Hewson by the University of Limerick.

Politics
Roche stood for the office of President of Ireland as a coalition candidate for the Labour Party, Democratic Left and the Green Party at the 1997 presidential election. 

Roche came fourth out of five candidates with almost 7% of the vote.

See also
 Chernobyl Children International
 Chernobyl disaster effects
 Chernobyl Heart
 Chernobyl Shelter Fund
 Black Wind, White Land
 Ali Hewson
 List of Chernobyl-related articles
 List of peace activists

References

External links
 Chernobyl Children International Website
 CCI Facebook
 CCI Twitter 
 CCI Instagram

1955 births
20th-century Irish people
21st-century Irish people
Living people
Candidates for President of Ireland
Irish humanitarians
Irish women in politics
People associated with the Chernobyl disaster
People from Clonmel
Politicians from County Tipperary
Irish anti-nuclear activists
Irish women activists
Recipients of the Ahmadiyya Muslim Peace Prize